Duša Počkaj (16 November 1924 – 24 June 1982) was a Slovenian film and theatre actress.

Following World War II Počkaj studied at the Ljubljana Academy of Theatre, Radio, Film and Television, and from 1946 until her death in 1982 she was member of the Ljubljana National Drama Theatre ensemble.

She started acting in films in the early 1950s and her biggest success was the starring role in the 1961 film Dancing in the Rain (Ples v dežju) directed by Boštjan Hladnik, for which she won the Golden Arena for Best Actress awards.

References

External links
 

1924 births
1982 deaths
People from Lendava
Slovenian stage actresses
Slovenian film actresses
Yugoslav actresses
Golden Arena winners
20th-century Slovenian actresses